The California Immigrant Union was an organization founded in 1869 to promote the settlement of California by people from the Eastern United States and from Europe.

The boosterism organization appears to have been active through at least 1875.

See also

William Erwin Willmore

References

Organizations based in California
Defunct organizations based in California
1870s in California
Organizations established in 1869
1869 establishments in California